"The Beatles' Movie Medley" is a compilation of snippets from various Beatles songs. It remains the only Beatles single not released on compact disc or music download (though needle drop recordings exist). The single peaked at No. 12 on the Billboard Hot 100, and No. 10 on the British charts in 1982. The songs were chosen from the Beatles' films, A Hard Day's Night, Help!, Magical Mystery Tour, Yellow Submarine and Let It Be.

Songs

The songs included in the medley are "Magical Mystery Tour", "All You Need Is Love", "You've Got to Hide Your Love Away", "I Should Have Known Better", "A Hard Day's Night", "Ticket to Ride", and "Get Back".  The medley was the first of two singles charting both in the US and the UK in the 1980s credited to the group (the other being a recharting of "Twist and Shout" in 1986). ("Love Me Do" reached no. 4 in the UK in 1982.)

Issue

Capitol Records first issued the single in conjunction with the album Reel Music and was inspired by the success of the "Stars On 45 Medley", a recording which included numerous Beatles songs sung by a John Lennon sound-alike. The song was released in the US as Capitol B-5107 on 22 March 1982.

Parlophone Records initially refused to issue the single in the United Kingdom, regarding the medley as "tacky". But after the import demand for the US release grew, it was finally issued as Parlophone R 6055. The original flip side was an interview with The Beatles about the making of the movie A Hard Day's Night. It was later re-released with "I'm Happy Just to Dance with You" on the flip side.

Chart performance

Weekly charts

Year-end charts

References

1982 songs
1982 singles
The Beatles songs
Music medleys
Parlophone singles
Song recordings produced by George Martin
Song recordings produced by Phil Spector
Songs written by Lennon–McCartney
Capitol Records singles